Mário Simas (16 February 1922 – 4 January 2015) was a Portuguese swimmer. He competed in the men's 100 metre backstroke at the 1948 Summer Olympics.

References

1922 births
2015 deaths
Portuguese male swimmers
Olympic swimmers of Portugal
Swimmers at the 1948 Summer Olympics
Place of birth missing
Male backstroke swimmers